Delon may refer to:

People with the surname 
 Alain Delon (born 1935), French actor
 Anthony Delon (born 1964), French-American actor, son of Alain Delon
  (1778–1838), French painter
 Nathalie Delon (1941–2021), French actress and director

People with the given name
 Delon Armitage (born 1983), rugby union footballer
 Delon Thamrin, Chinese-Indonesian singer and runner-up in the first season of the reality series Indonesian Idol
 DeLon Turner, basketball player
 Delon Wright (born 1992), American basketball player

Fictional characters 
 Dela Delon, villain of the video game Brandish

Science and technology 
 Delon circuit, a voltage doubler circuit

See also 
 DeLon (born 1987), Sri Lankan-American rapper and actor
 Guy de Lons or Guy of Lescar (died 1141), Roman Catholic Bishop of Lescar (1115-1141)

French-language surnames